Myauk Pyinthe (or ; lit. "Queen of the Northern Palace") was a queen consort of three kings of Pagan, Saw Rahan II, Kunhsaw Kyaunghpyu and Sokkate, and the mother of King Anawrahta, the founder of the Pagan Empire.

Brief
According to the royal chronicles, she was of royal descent and the youngest of three sisters. She and her two elder sisters were married off to King Saw Rahan ( 1000). Her two elder sisters became known as Taung Pyinthe ("Queen of the Southern Palace") and Ale Pyinthe ("Queen of the Central Palace") while she received the title, Myauk Pyinthe ("Queen of the Northern Palace"). In 1001, they became queens consort of Kunhsaw who seized the throne by assassinating Saw Rahan. On 11 May 1014, Myauk Pyinthe gave birth to a child, Min Saw (later known as Anawrahta). She later became Queen of the Southern Palace, or the chief queen.

In 1021, Kunhsaw was overthrown and forced to become a monk by his adopted sons Kyiso and Sokkate. Myauk Pyinthe and Min Saw also moved next to the monastery where the deposed king lived on as a monk. The arrangement last until 1044 when Sokkate, who had become king since 1044, forcibly raised Myauk Pyinthe, his maternal aunt, as his queen. It angered Min Saw, who promptly revolted against his cousin. Min Saw slayed Sokkate on 11 August 1044 in single combat on horseback, and seized the throne. Chronicles say that the queen dedicated two temples named Pottalin and Yin-Wut-Kyut, after hearing the news of her son's victory over Sokkate. 

Anawrahta also consorted his mother to be his queen.

Notes

References

Bibliography
 
 
 

Chief queens consort of Pagan
Year of death unknown
Year of birth unknown
11th-century Burmese women
10th-century Burmese women